The Inline Alpine World Championships is the premier inline alpine championship organised by World Skate. The competition has been recognized since 2012 and has taken place roughly biennially since. It has been included in all occurrences of the World Skate Games since its beginning in 2017. World Skate has organized this championship in partnership with the International World Inline Alpine Committee (WIAC), which started unofficial championships in 2010

Venues

Elite Medallists

Men

Slalom

Parallel slalom

Giant slalom

Combined race

Women

Slalom

Parallel slalom

Giant slalom

Combined race

Mixed

Team slalom

References

Recurring sporting events established in 2012
Inline alpine